Dimitar Dimitrov Dobrev (14 April 1931 – 1 April 2019) was a Greco-Roman wrestler from Bulgaria, where he spent most of his professional career. Dobrev was the Olympic champion in the middleweight division of  Greco-Roman Wrestling at the 1960 Summer Olympics.

Born in Ezerche, Dobrev was a mathematician, and, prior to his competitive wrestling career, he was a gymnast.

See also 
 Evelin Banev "Brendo"

References

External links
Dimitar Dobrev

1931 births
2019 deaths
Olympic wrestlers of Bulgaria
Wrestlers at the 1956 Summer Olympics
Wrestlers at the 1960 Summer Olympics
Bulgarian male sport wrestlers
Olympic gold medalists for Bulgaria
Olympic silver medalists for Bulgaria
Olympic medalists in wrestling
People from Razgrad Province
Medalists at the 1960 Summer Olympics
Medalists at the 1956 Summer Olympics
20th-century Bulgarian people
21st-century Bulgarian people